Imam Din Gohavia is  a 1967 Pakistani, biographical film in the Punjabi language about the British Raj, directed by M. Saleem and produced by Chaudhry Mohammad Aslam. It stars Akmal Khan, Yousuf Khan and Talish.

Cast

 Akmal Khan as Imam Din Gohavia 
 Firdous
 Gulsan
 Yousuf Khan
 A. Khan
 Asad Bokhari
 Meena Shorey
 Sikedar
 Ilyas Kashmiri
 Talish
 Mohammad Ali  
 Amin Malik (Guest Appearance)
 Munawar Zarif as Shamaulu
 Saeed Khan Rangeela
 Zulfi
 Khalifa Nazir
 Chham Chham
 Sultan Rahi  
 Ajmal 
 Zeenat Begum
 Fazal Haq
 Farida 
 Tahira
 Sheikh Iqbal
 Jaggi
 Shakeel
 Iqbal Hassan

Soundtrack
The music of the film is by G.A. Chishti. The lyrics were written by  Waris Ludhianvi, Manzoor Jhalla and Sikedar

Track listing

References

External links
 

1967 films
History of Pakistan on film
Films set in the British Raj
Pakistani biographical films
Pakistani crime films
Punjabi-language Pakistani films
1960s Punjabi-language films